Shanna the She-Devil (Shanna O'Hara, Lady Plunder) is a fictional jungle adventurer superhero appearing in American comic books published by Marvel Comics. Created by writer Carole Seuling and penciller George Tuska, she made her first appearance in Shanna the She-Devil #1 (Dec. 1972).

Publication history
Shanna the She-Devil was introduced in one of a trio of Marvel Comics aimed at a female audience, alongside Night Nurse and Claws of the Cat. Marvel writer-editor Roy Thomas recalled in 2007 that editor-in-chief Stan Lee:

Seuling in 2010 recalled: "My instructions were to make [Shanna] someone who would fit in with the times and also was prone to a little more violence than Sheena or the other jungle queens of the past". With veteran penciler George Tuska, she created the lead character and her two leopard companions, as well as game warden and potential romantic interest Patrick McShane, loosely based on after actor Patrick McGoohan's game-warden character in the film Nor the Moon by Night.

The writer Steve Gerber, in his first assignment for Marvel Comics, supplied additional dialogue for that first issue, as well as the next. Seuling explained:

Steve Gerber did not collaborate with me on the scripts or the origin story, but he added some additional dialogue since Stan [Lee] and Roy [Thomas] thought the stories were a bit light on the talking.

However, ... Steve Gerber was not one of the creators. He provided additional dialogue for the first two [issues] and then took over when I left [after four issues]. ... Gerber himself, before he died a few years ago, denied that he had any part in Shanna's origin.

This initial series ran five issues (Dec. 1972 - Aug. 1973), with Jim Steranko drawing the covers of #1-2, John Buscema and Joe Sinnott of issue #3, and John Romita Sr. of the final two issues.

The character went on to a series of guest appearances, first in the jungle lord comic Ka-Zar #1 (Jan. 1974); then in a storyline running through the superhero comics Daredevil #109-111 (May–July 1974) and Marvel Two-in-One #3 (May 1974), which supplied additional details about Shanna's past and family, and notes McShane's murder by the supervillainess Nekra in the interim; in Daredevil #117 (Jan. 1975); and in a Ka-Zar story in the black-and-white, mature-audience comics magazine Savage Tales #8 (Jan. 1975).

Shanna then starred in two solo stories in Savage Tales #9-10 (March & May 1975) by writer Carla Conway (assisted by then-husband Gerry Conway on the former), with pencil art by, respectively, Tony DeZuniga and Ross Andru. In the first of these two stories, Shanna's leopards Ina and Biri are killed. Gerry Conway recalled in 2010 that this "was part of the strategy to make her a stronger, fiercer character in the Savage Tales mode. It also raised the stakes for her personally, and by eliminating these 'rivals' for her affections opened her up to a relationship with Ka-Zar", whom she would eventually marry, in Ka-Zar the Savage #29 (Dec. 1983).

In the meantime, Shanna starred in a backup story in The Rampaging Hulk #9 (June 1978), by writer Gerber and artist DeZuniga. She then starred in several eight-page solo stories in the omnibus title Marvel Comics Presents, beginning with a tale by writer-artist Bruce Jones in issue #13 (Late Feb. 1989), followed by the 10-part "The Bush of Ghosts", by writer Gerard Jones and penciler Paul Gulacy in issues #68-77 (Jan.-Late May 1991).

Dovetailing with the end of that run came four full-length stories begun in 1978, completing plot threads from Shanna's solo story in The Rampaging Hulk #9. Written by Steve Gerber and penciled by Carmine Infantino, Bret Blevins (two stories, the first credited as "A. Novice") and DeZuniga, these non-chronological, essentially flashback stories ran in Marvel Fanfare #56-59 (April-Oct. 1991). The title's editor, Al Milgrom, unearthed the unpublished stories because

Marvel has also published alternate universe versions of Shanna, unrelated except for the name.

Shanna was featured in the Marvel NOW! book titled Savage Wolverine. The new series, written and drawn by Frank Cho, debuted in January 2013. The title is a team-up story with Shanna and Wolverine as they try to survive the Savage Land together.

Fictional character biography

Shanna O'Hara, Lady Plunder is the daughter of an Irish diamond miner named Gerald O'Hara. Born in Africa, she spent the majority of her childhood growing up in the jungles of Zaire. At the age of six, her father went to kill a rogue leopard that belonged to her mother, Patricia O'Hara. While hunting for the leopard, Shanna's father accidentally killed her mother. This traumatic incident led to Shanna's lifelong crusade against the use of firearms. After the incident, Shanna moved to the United States to live with relatives. Shanna grows up to become an accomplished Olympic athlete, specializing in competitive swimming and track and field. She then became a licensed veterinarian.

After completing college, Shanna began to work for the Central Park Municipal Zoo in New York City as a zoologist. While working at the zoo, Shanna raised many animals, including a female leopard named Julani. During this period another shock to her system came when Julani was shot and killed by a zoo guard. The following day, the zoo director proposes Shanna take Julani's cubs, Ina and Biri — Yoruba names meaning "bright" and "black", respectively — to the Dahomey Reserve in Africa.

While in Africa, Shanna becomes more attuned to nature, patrolling the jungle and living freely in the wild lands. She begins to wear Julani's fur pelt as a sight-and-sense cue to help with the raising of the cubs. In the jungle, Shanna becomes more and more at home with herself and her new native element, all the while protecting the reserve from poachers as Shanna the She-Devil.

During her stay in Africa, her father is kidnapped by the Mandrill. Shanna searches for him until the wizard Malgato kidnaps her to the Savage Land, a prehistoric jungle within Antarctica. She escapes with the help of Lord Kevin Plunder, a.k.a. the jungle lord Ka-Zar. Shanna returns to Africa to look for her father, and learns he was killed by the Mandrill. Seeking revenge, she goes to North America to aid Daredevil and Black Widow in stopping the Mandrill and Nekra's plan to overthrow the American government.

After this, Shanna travels between San Francisco and the Savage Land, finally returning to Africa only to find Ina and Biri have been killed by a cult leader named Raga-Shah. After a short grieving period in North America, Shanna tracks and kills Raga-Shah by feeding him to her python Ananta. Around this time, she begins therapy with psychologist Dr. Dorothy Betz.

Shanna returned to the Savage Land and became Ka-Zar's lover. They discovered their lost world was only part of a larger realm, Pangea, filled with wondrous races. The couple's relationship was tempestuous: Shanna married Mele of the Botor who died in a hunting accident while with Ka-Zar. Shanna was also targeted by the demonic Belasco (who felt she resembled his lost love Beatrice). When Ka-Zar was seemingly killed while they were in New York, a distraught Shanna rampaged, was institutionalized, and nearly romanced Peter Parker. Shanna was rescued by a revived Ka-Zar, aided by Spider-Man, and the two returned to Antarctica, where they were married despite interference from Belasco and others. They employed the native warrior woman Zhira as nanny and protector of their son Matthew.

They survived the temporary destruction of the Savage Land by Terminus and its later re-creation by the High Evolutionary and Garokk.

Shanna briefly attained a mystical bond to the spirit of Africa, foiling Sir Guy Cross-Wallace who slaughtered and consumed wildlife, seeking the bond himself to rule the continent. Shanna was also briefly given power over the natural world by the High Evolutionary. Together, Ka-Zar and Shanna fight to preserve the Savage Land from external threats and from pollution by technology.

Shanna and Ka-Zar find Skrulls mining the rare metal vibranium in the Savage Land. Soon afterward as part of the "Secret Invasion" storyline, a Skrull ship crashes in the Savage Land, releasing earlier versions of modern superheroes (who claim to be the originals replaced by Skrulls for some time, and who have escaped). Shanna and Ka-Zar soon learn, however, that these are simply more Skrulls in disguise. Spider-Man soon encounters Ka-Zar, Shanna, Zabu, and some of the natives accusing them of being Skrulls. Just then, the Captain America from the ship attacked, thinking the same for Spider-Man. Ka-Zar, Shanna, and Zabu help Spider-Man fight the Captain America from the ship until it is hit by a dart that causes it to regress to a Skrull named Pit'o Nilli. Shanna then kills Pit'o Nilli. Shanna stays behind with Zabu to fight off any Skrulls left in the Savage Land, while Ka-Zar heads with the New Avengers and the Mighty Avengers to New York to fight the Skrulls.

Ka-Zar and Shanna later encounter the return of the Ethereals and end up fighting them when it comes to the Ethereals wanting the tribes of the Savage Land to be united with them.

As part of the 2012 Marvel NOW! branding in the pages of Savage Wolverine, Shanna agrees to guide a group of S.H.I.E.L.D. agents to a mysterious island within the Savage Land. A dampening field generator causes the transport to crash, and all the agents are killed by the native Neanderthals. At the same time, Wolverine crashes on the island, and joins with Shanna the She-Devil to destroy the dampening field generator. When Shanna the She-Devil is accidentally killed by the Neanderthals after running into Amadeus Cho, Amadeus and the local Neanderthals perform a ritual that involves a Man-Thing different from Ted Sallis that was rooted in the Savage Land for a long time. A blood sample was taken from it and Shanna was reborn. They then encountered the Hulk where a fight between him, Wolverine, and the giant gorillas accidentally damaged the dampening fields, which freed the alien Morrigon who returns to his master Visher-Rakk.

During the "Empyre" storyline, Shanna the She-Devil falls under the control of the Cotati that were operating in the Savage Land. This was because of Shanna's connection with the Savage Land's life force and the Cotati took advantage of that. Shanna tries to get Ka-Zar to join them as Matthew states to the Black Knight that they have to do something. Doctor Voodoo used a trick to do a mental trick. The Scarlet Witch does the same as she tries to free Shanna from the Cotati's control. To assist her, the Scarlet Witch brings Ka-Zar into Shanna's mind, where he learns that some creatures in the Savage Land are dying and trees are falling. As Matthew and the Black Knight fight the Cotati, a Doctor Voodoo-controlled Man-Thing fights the Cotati's control and defeats Ventri. When Ka-Zar frees Shanna from the Cotati's control, he is stabbed by a Cotati using the Black Knight's Ebony Blade. As the Scarlet Witch and Doctor Voodoo work to extract Ka-Zar's soul, Shanna the She-Devil uses the same waters that resurrected her in order to revive her lost love. The newly returned Ka-Zar helps turns the tide on the Cotati invaders by working with his wife in summoning dinosaurs to help repel boarders.

Powers and abilities
Shanna is gifted with Olympic-class athleticism along with extraordinary agility. She is a well-trained veterinarian, with the capability of being close to wild animals. Shanna is adept at hunting and gathering, healing and tracking. She is an experienced fighter, familiar with knives, spears, bows and arrows and other primitive forms of weapons. She has Olympic athlete-level strength: naturally excelling at swimming, diving, climbing, leaping, and running with great speed and determination.

After her resurrection, Shanna is tied into the life force of the Savage Land. She also instinctively knows the languages and history of the Savage Land and its people. Now not only possessing the strength of 10 men whilst being able to run 52 miles per hour over uneven terrain. The She-Devil now has an unmitigated connection with the floral and faunal elements of the rural era environs. Being able to discharge energy blasts, bend plant matter to her will and directly communicate with the creatures of the land around her to enlist their aid.

Other versions

Frank Cho version
A blonde, alternate-universe version of the character starred in the seven-issue miniseries Shanna, the She-Devil (vol. 2) (April-Oct. 2005), written and drawn by Frank Cho. This Shanna is the result of genetic experimentation that endows her with superhuman strength and agility. One member of a scientific expedition that encounters her names her Shanna "after the comic book character". The series was published with a "PSR+" rating through issue #4, and a "Parental Advisory" rating afterward.

A four-issue sequel miniseries, Shanna the She-Devil: Survival of the Fittest (Oct. 2007 - Jan. 2008) by writers Justin Gray and James Palmiotti and penciller Khari Evans, features this same alternate version of Shanna.

Ultimate Marvel
Shanna and Ka-Zar first appear in the Ultimate Marvel imprint on the final page of Ultimates 3 #3. Flashbacks reveal that she, Ka-Zar, and Zabu have been friends since childhood. After the Ultimatum wave, they join the New Ultimates where they helped to fight Loki.

Reception
Shanna was ranked 53rd in Comics Buyer's Guide's "100 Sexiest Women in Comics" list.

In other media

Television
 Shanna the She-Devil appeared in the Spider-Man and His Amazing Friends episode "7 Little Superheroes", voiced by Janet Waldo. However, she was referred to as Shanna the Jungle Queen instead of the She-Devil. She alongside Spider-Man, Iceman, Firestar, Captain America, Namor and Doctor Strange are invited to Wolf Island where Chameleon ends up hunting them.
 Shanna the She-Devil appears in X-Men: The Animated Series, voiced by Megan Smith. She is seen as Ka-Zar's wife and was first seen being chased by and later hypnotized by Sauron in Mojovision. She is seen later on as one of the prisoners of Mister Sinister. Shanna is present as Ka-Zar welcomes Karl Lykos into his tribe following Garokk's defeat.

Video games
 Shanna the She-Devil appeared in X-Men Legends II: Rise of Apocalypse, voiced by Masasa Moyo. She and Ka-Zar are seen in Magneto's base in Avalon during the X-Men and Brotherhood of Mutants' mission in the Savage Land.
 In Marvel vs. Capcom 3: Fate of Two Worlds, Shanna (along with Ka-Zar and Zabu), make a cameo in Amaterasu's ending. In it, Amaterasu and her Celestial Envoy Issun find themselves in the Savage Land, and team up with the trio to fend off a wild Tyrannosaurus.
 Shanna the She-Devil appears in Marvel Heroes, voiced by Catherine Taber.
 Shanna appeared as a playable character in Marvel: Avengers Alliance. She was purchasable once the player has completed a series of side-quests.

Collected editions

See also
 Cavewoman
 Jann of the Jungle
 Jungle Girl (Dynamite Entertainment)

References

External links
 Shanna the She-Devil at Marvel.com
 Shanna the She-Devil at Marvel Wiki
 Shanna the She-Devil at Comic Vine

Characters created by George Tuska
Comics characters introduced in 1972
Fictional competitive swimmers
Fictional conservationists and environmentalists
Fictional explorers
Fictional hunters
Fictional Irish people
Fictional Olympic competitors
Fictional queens
Fictional track and field athletes
Fictional veterinarians
Fictional women soldiers and warriors
Irish superheroes
Jungle girls
Jungle superheroes
Marvel Comics characters with superhuman strength
Marvel Comics female superheroes
Marvel Comics orphans